Chalco may refer to:
Chalco de Díaz Covarrubias, or simply Chalco, seat of the municipality of Chalco, State of México
Chalco (altépetl), an altépetl or pre-Columbian city-state in central Mexico
Lake Chalco, endorheic lake formerly located in the Valley of Mexico
Chalco, Nebraska in northern Sarpy County, Nebraska, United States
Chalco Hills Recreation Area in Nebraska
Valle de Chalco Solidaridad, a municipality located in State of Mexico, Mexico
Chalco, Aluminum Corporation of China Limited
The Chalco system in A. A. Attanasio's The Last Legends of Earth

See also
Calco
Chaco (disambiguation)
Chalcon